Christopher Duffy (21 October 1918 – 20 February 1978) was a Scottish footballer who played as a left winger in the English Football League. He scored the only goal for Charlton Athletic in extra time in the 1947 FA Cup Final, against Burnley.

Duffy, a fast and intelligent winger, first came to Charlton Athletic as a war time guest player. A modest fee of £330 persuaded his home club, Leith Athletic to relinquish his services when he was demobilised from the armed forces. His appearance against Burnley was his third Cup Final. He aided Charlton against Chelsea in the 1944 "South" Final and against Derby County the following year.

References

External links

1918 births
1978 deaths
People from Methil
Footballers from Fife
Scottish footballers
Association football outside forwards
Charlton Athletic F.C. wartime guest players
Charlton Athletic F.C. players
Leith Athletic F.C. players
English Football League players
Scottish Football League players
FA Cup Final players